Noxapaga River (alternates: Kugrukruk and Kugirukuk) is a  tributary of the Kuzitrin River on the Seward Peninsula in the U.S. state of Alaska. Tributaries include the creeks of Aurora, Berry, Black, Bluff, Boulder, Buzzard, Frost, Garfield, Goodall, Goose, Grouse, Last Chance, Little Garfield, Mascot, Money, Peuk, Stony, Turner, and Winona.

Geography
Its principal tributaries are East Fork and Berry, Aurora, and Turner creeks. Most of the eastern portion of the drainage basin has been covered with a lava flow, and this portion furnishes practically all the discharge of the river at low water. The western portion of the drainage basin includes several streams on which mining operations have been conducted, especially Boulder Creek, a tributary of Turner Creek, where five or six claims were worked intermittently.

The river has a sinuous course across the valley lowland. At this point, it receives a large tributary from the north, known as Turner Creek, where the settlement, Noxapaga, the recording office of the district, was located. Their upper waters lie in valleys incised in the higher plateau. Gold has been obtained from Garfield, Boulder, and Goose creeks.

See also
List of rivers of Alaska

References

Bibliography

Rivers of the Seward Peninsula
Rivers of Alaska
Rivers of Nome Census Area, Alaska
Rivers of Unorganized Borough, Alaska
Rivers of Northwest Arctic Borough, Alaska